Amphoraspis stellata is an amphiaspidid heterostracan in the family Amphiaspididae. Its fossils are restricted to early Devonian-aged marine strata of the Taimyr Peninsula, Siberia. A. stellata, as with all other amphiaspidids, is thought to have been a benthic filter feeder that lived on top of, or buried just below the surface of the substrate of hypersaline lagoon-bottoms.

So far, A. stellata is known from at least one, 14 centimeter-long, broad and dorsally rounded cephalothoracic armor that is shaped vaguely like, as the generic name suggests, an amphora.  The animal had small, possibly degenerate eyes that were flanked laterally by a small, crescent-shaped branchial opening.  The small eyes, in turn, laterally flank a small, slit-shaped mouth at the center of the anterior-most end of the cephalothorax.  The external surface of the armor has a unique micro-ornamentation of a pattern of star-like shapes.

References 

Amphiaspidida
Devonian jawless fish
Early Devonian fish
Cyathaspidiformes genera
Fauna of Siberia
Fossils of Russia
Early Devonian first appearances
Devonian extinctions
Fossil taxa described in 1989